Erik Eliasen (9 September 1922 – 11 October 2008) was a Danish meteorologist.

He was born in Slagelse. He was a professor of meteorology at the University of Copenhagen from 1961 to 1992. He was a fellow of the Norwegian Academy of Science and Letters from 1988.

References

1922 births
2008 deaths
Danish meteorologists
Academic staff of the University of Copenhagen
Members of the Norwegian Academy of Science and Letters